Piegan Glacier is in Glacier National Park in the U.S. state of Montana. Comparing images of the glacier taken in 1930 with those from 1998, indicates that the glacier experienced relatively little change during that period.

See also
 List of glaciers in the United States
 Glaciers in Glacier National Park (U.S.)

References

Glaciers of Glacier County, Montana
Glaciers of Glacier National Park (U.S.)
Glaciers of Montana